Tahvon Ravell Campbell (born 10 January 1997) is an English professional footballer who plays as a winger for Aldershot Town, on loan from Rochdale.

Career

West Bromwich Albion
Born in Birmingham, Campbell started his career at West Bromwich Albion, joining the club in 2006. Ahead of the 2015–16 season, Campbell signed for National League side Kidderminster Harriers on loan until 2 January 2016. Having made 15 appearances for Kidderminster, Campbell was recalled to West Brom on 22 October 2015.

On 2 January 2016, Campbell joined Football League Two side Yeovil Town on a one-month loan deal, he made his debut later that day in a 1–0 win against York City. He scored his debut professional goal with a curling shot from 25 yards, in Yeovil's 2–1 victory over Crawley Town on 23 January 2016. On 5 August 2016, he returned to Yeovil on a further sixth-month loan deal.

On 31 January 2017, Campbell joined Notts County on loan until the end of the season.

On 20 January 2018, Campbell joined Forest Green Rovers in League Two for the remainder of the 2017–18 season. Campbell was released by West Bromwich Albion at the end of the 2017–18 season.

Forest Green Rovers
Following his release he subsequently joined Forest Green on a permanent deal following his earlier loan spell, signing a one-year deal with the League Two side. On 31 January 2019, he joined Gillingham on loan.

He was released by Forest Green Rovers at the end of the 2018–19 season.

Cheltenham Town
On 14 June 2019, Campbell signed a two-year contract with Cheltenham Town. In November 2020 he joined Gloucester City on loan until January 2021. On 18 January 2021, Campbell joined National League side FC Halifax Town on loan for the remainder of the 2020-21 season.

Woking
On 24 July 2021, Campbell agreed to join National League side, Woking following a short-term trial period. On the opening day of the 2021–22 campaign, Campbell made his Woking debut during their 2–1 away victory at Wealdstone, featuring for 82 minutes before being replaced by George Oakley. Just over a week later, Campbell scored his first goals for the club in a 4–0 away victory at Torquay United, netting in both the 3rd and 55th minute. Campbell continued his impressive goalscoring form into September, with four goals in the space of three days in the club's 3–2 defeat to Eastleigh and 3–1 victory over Chesterfield.

Rochdale
On 27 January 2022, Campbell joined Rochdale on a two-and-a-half year contract for an undisclosed fee.

Aldershot Town
In March 2023, Campbell joined Aldershot Town of the National League on loan for the remainder of the season.

Career statistics

Honours

Cheltenham Town 
League Two: 2020–21

References

External links

1997 births
Living people
English footballers
West Bromwich Albion F.C. players
Kidderminster Harriers F.C. players
Yeovil Town F.C. players
Notts County F.C. players
Solihull Moors F.C. players
Forest Green Rovers F.C. players
Gillingham F.C. players
Cheltenham Town F.C. players
Gloucester City A.F.C. players
FC Halifax Town players
Woking F.C. players
Rochdale A.F.C. players
Aldershot Town F.C. players
National League (English football) players
English Football League players
Association football forwards
Black British sportspeople
Footballers from Birmingham, West Midlands